Solioccasus is a fungal genus in the family Boletaceae. It is a monotypic genus, containing the single Australasian species Solioccasus polychromus. It is initially dull white, but becomes yellow to pink to orange to red in maturity, making it one of the most brightly colored hypogeous species known.

Solioccasus polychromus is found in northern Australia, including Queensland and the Northern Territory, and Papua New Guinea. The fruitbodies grow in the ground or partially emergent in lowland tropical and subtropical forests, often in sandy soil. Plant associates include Allocasuarina littoralis, Corymbia dichromophloia, C. erythrophloia, C. polycarpa, Eucalyptus pellita, E. pilularis, E. racemosa, E. tetrodonta, and species from the genera Leptospermum, Lophostemon, and Melaleuca.

References

External links
 

Boletaceae
Fungi of New Guinea
Monotypic Boletales genera
Fungi native to Australia